20 The Shambles is an historic building in the English city of York, North Yorkshire. A Grade II listed building, part of the structure dates to the early 18th century, with alterations made in both the 19th and 20th centuries.

As of 2018, the building was occupied by The Flax & Twine.

References 

20
Houses in North Yorkshire
Buildings and structures in North Yorkshire
18th-century establishments in England
Grade II listed buildings in York
Grade II listed houses
18th century in York